"Dap Prampi Mesa Moha Chokchey" was the national anthem of Democratic Kampuchea from at least January 1976. Although the anthem may have been in use in the "liberated zone" much earlier, it was proclaimed the national anthem in article 18 of the Constitution of Kampuchea which was promulgated on 5 January 1976. Supposedly, the Khmer Rouge and/or Pol Pot himself wrote the piece, but its origin remains unknown.

After Vietnam militarily intervened and forced the Khmer Rouge out of most of Cambodia, the People's Republic of Kampuchea was established and used a new anthem. However the Coalition Government of Democratic Kampuchea continued to use "Dap Prampi Mesa Chokchey" as its state anthem in exile. And since the Coalition Government was recognized as the legitimate government of Cambodia by many Western nations and the United Nations, its state anthem continued to be presented as the national anthem of Cambodia in the West until the restoration of the monarchy in 1993.

Lyrics

References

External links 
 Listening Dap Prampi Mesa Chokchey
 Lyrics of Dap Prampi Mesa Chokchey
 Dap Prampi Mesa Chokchey's video clip at YouTube
 MIDI file (Encarta93′s version)
 MIDI file (WK Midi's version)
 Other MIDI file

Asian anthems
Cambodian songs
Democratic Kampuchea
Historical national anthems
National symbols of Cambodia